Szolnoki Légierő Sport Klub was a Hungarian football club from the town of Szolnok, Hungary.

History
Szolnoki Légierő Sport Klub debuted in the 1955 season of the Hungarian League and finished fourteenth.

Name Changes 
1951–1953: Mátyásföldi Honvéd Iljusin SK
1953–1957: Légierő SK
1954: moved to Szolnok
1957: merger with Vasas Ikarus and  Mátyásföldi SC as Mátyásföldi-Ikarus

References

External links
 Profile

Football clubs in Hungary
Defunct football clubs in Hungary